Balla Philip is a small community in Weldford Parish, New Brunswick, located 5.56 km South of South Branch.  The community is located on Route 495.

History

Balla Philip had a Post Office from 1910 to 1958.  The community was named for Ballyphilip in County Tipperary, Ireland.

Notable people

See also
List of communities in New Brunswick

References

Settlements in New Brunswick
Communities in Kent County, New Brunswick